The 2007–08 season was Crystal Palace Football Club's third consecutive season in The Championship. Manager Peter Taylor was sacked on 8 October 2007 and replaced by former Sheffield United manager Neil Warnock on 11 October 2007.

Statistics

Appearances
Last updated on 13 May 2008.

|}

Players

Starting 11

Club

Management

League table

Matches

Preseason

Football League Championship

Football League Championship play-offs

Semi-final

Football League Cup

Round 1

FA Cup

Round 3

End-of-season awards

References

Notes

External links
 Crystal Palace F.C. official website
 Crystal Palace F.C. on Soccerbase

Crystal Palace F.C. seasons
Crystal Palace